Awake is the debut album by American acoustic rock musician, John Vesely, under the pseudonym Secondhand Serenade. The album was originally released as a demo, in 2005. In late 2006, Secondhand Serenade signed to label Glassnote Records and re-released the album on January 31, 2007.

Re-release

In early 2007, the album was reissued by Glassnote Records with an additional two songs. It was released on February 6 and gave Vesely his first chartings, debuting at #16 on Billboards Top Heatseekers chart. Added success lead to it peaking at #164 on the Billboard 200, #3 on the Top Heatseekers and #19 on the Top Independent Albums chart.

Single
Secondhand Serenade released only one song as a single from the debut album, "Vulnerable". The song spawned a music video, which was created by Frank Borin who was responsible for the Red Hot Chili Peppers' video for hit single "Dani California". "Vulnerable" peaked at #83 on the Billboard Hot 100, #64 on the Pop 100 and #56 on the Hot Digital Songs charts.

Track listing

Credits
 John Vesely - guitar and vocals
 Ronnie Day - piano on tracks 4, 8 and 12
 Tracked, mixed and mastered at SF Soundworks
 Engineer: Rachel Allgood & Adam Munoz
 Mastered by: Tony Espinoza & Loredana Palomares
 Assistants: Loredanna Palomares, Aaron DeMateo

References

External links
Official Myspace

2007 albums
Secondhand Serenade albums
Glassnote Records albums